The Ardlair Stone is a class I Pictish stone that stands in a field in Ardlair, Kennethmont, Aberdeenshire, Scotland. It is associated with a number of other stones that have been proposed by some to be the remains of a recumbent stone circle.

Description
A rough hewn stone of grey Gneiss, the stone was identified as Pictish in 1901. The stone bears the incised symbols of the Pictish beast, the tuning fork and the mirror.

References

External links

Pictish stones
Pictish stones in Aberdeenshire
Scheduled Ancient Monuments in Aberdeenshire